The 2021 ACC Championship Game was a college football game played on December 4, 2021, at Bank of America Stadium in Charlotte, North Carolina. It was the 17th edition of the ACC Championship Game and determined the champion of the Atlantic Coast Conference for the 2021 season. The game began at 8:15 p.m. EST and aired on ABC. The game featured the Wake Forest Demon Deacons, the Atlantic Division champions, and the Pittsburgh Panthers, the Coastal Division champions. Sponsored by restaurant chain Subway, the game was known as the Subway ACC Championship Game.

Teams
The 2021 ACC Championship Game featured the Pittsburgh Panthers, champions of the Coastal Division, and the Wake Forest Demon Deacons, champions of the Atlantic Division. It was only the second all-time meeting between the teams, with Pittsburgh winning the only previous meeting, in 2018, by a score of 34–13. This was each teams' second appearance in the ACC title game; Wake Forest won its lone previous appearance in 2006, while Pittsburgh lost its lone previous appearance in 2018.

This was the first ACC Championship game since 2014 where Clemson does not appear; the Tigers have won each of the last six championship games. Further, Pittsburgh will attempt to become the first Coastal Division team to win the ACC Championship since Virginia Tech did it in 2010. Entering the game, the winner of the last eight ACC Championship Games has gone on to compete in the College Football Playoff; it is expected that the streak will not continue to include the 2021 champions.

Pittsburgh

Led by head coach Pat Narduzzi, in his seventh season, the Pittsburgh Panthers opened their 2021 campaign with a rout of UMass at home. The Panthers followed this victory with a road contest against Tennessee; after a slow start, a 27-point second quarter propelled them to a one-touchdown win, 41–34. Pitt's third game of the season saw them face Western Michigan, who scored an upset against the Panthers in a 44–41 win, the first Power Five win they'd achieved under head coach Tim Lester. This was all despite the fact that Pitt quarterback Kenny Pickett succeeded in tying the school's single-game record for passing touchdowns, set by Dan Marino, with six. Narduzzi's squad was able to bounce back the following week, as they "drilled" New Hampshire by ten touchdowns to move to 3–1. A pair of conference games on the road faced the Panthers to open the month of October; they defeated Georgia Tech by a 31-point margin, in a win that was helped by the Pitt defense intercepting Tech quarterback Jeff Sims on each of his first two passes of the game, the second of which was returned for a touchdown. Pitt continued their good form in the following week's game at Virginia Tech, where they won a lower-scoring contest by a margin of three touchdowns. This second win propelled the Panthers into the AP poll for the first time in the season, as they were ranked No. 23 entering their next matchup against defending ACC champions Clemson. Pittsburgh defeated Clemson by ten points, before concluding October with a home game against Miami, who was able to hand Pitt their second loss of the season with a four point win. Pittsburgh was able to respond again, as they got through November with a perfect record following defeats of Duke, North Carolina, Virginia, and Syracuse, sending them to the title game with a 10–2 record. They clinched their spot in the championship game on November 20, after their defeat of Virginia.

Wake Forest

The Demon Deacons and eighth-year head coach Dave Clawson opened their season with a trio of home games. The first two, both non-conference, saw the Deacons defeat Old Dominion and Norfolk State with relative ease, by margins of 32 and 25 points, respectively. The Demon Deacons opened conference play the following week at home against Florida State, winning the game by three touchdowns. They fared similarly the following Friday evening at Virginia, as Wake defeated the Cavaliers by twenty and, as a result, entered the AP Poll at No. 24 the following week. Wake forest returned home and edged Louisville in a three-point contest. Another three-point game followed, as No. 19 Wake Forest defeated Syracuse on the road in overtime to move to 6–0. To finish the month of October, the Demon Deacons defeated Army in a high scoring 70–56 affair that saw quarterback Sam Hartman set a new Michie Stadium record for single-game passing yards and featured just one punt in its entirety. Wake returned home to conclude the month for their homecoming game against Duke, and defeated the Blue Devils by 38 points to move to 8–0 on the year, marking the best start to a season in school history. The following week, Wake achieved a ranking of No. 9 in the first College Football Playoff rankings to be released, but suffered their season's first loss on the road against North Carolina; though North Carolina is an ACC opponent, the game did not count as a conference game since it was scheduled between the two schools in order to play each other more often than ACC scheduling would otherwise allow. In their home finale, the Demon Deacons earned their first win over a ranked opponent when they defeated No. 16 NC State by a field goal. The Deacons returned to the top ten in time for their matchup with Clemson, though the Tigers defeated Wake in convincing fashion, handing the Demon Deacons their first conference loss of the season. Despite this, Wake Forest secured its spot in the championship game in its final regular season game on November 27, defeating Boston College by a score of 41–10.

Game summary

Fake slide controversy
On the first drive of the game, Pittsburgh quarterback Kenny Pickett scored a touchdown on a 58-yard run to put the Pittsburgh Panthers up 7-0. During the run, around the Demon Deacons' 40-yard line, Pickett dipped his right knee as though he were going to slide and give himself up. Pickett did not slide and continued running for a touchdown.

The "fake slide" was immediately the subject of controversy. In college football, a defensive player who makes contact with a quarterback who is giving themselves up can be subject to a 15-yard unnecessary roughness penalty or possibly ejection. As a result, defensive players usually let up and avoid continuing a play when a quarterback initiates a slide. Pickett acknowledged that his fake slide intentionally took advantage of this, saying, "Yeah, it was intentional. I just kind of started slowing down and pulling up and getting ready to slide. I just kind of saw their body language and they just pulled up as well."

After the game, many acknowledged the play as innovative and clever while simultaneously arguing it was a rules loophole that should be closed. For example, Wake Forest coach Dave Clawson acknowledged there was no rule preventing Pickett from fake sliding and praised such a play as "brilliant" while pointing out that it placed the defense at a huge disadvantage. Former NFL referee Gene Steratore said, "I wish they would implement a change in the rule effective immediately just to get rid of it. Just make it a blown dead play. I’d love to see them do that right now so that they don’t run into another situation like that potentially during the Bowls and the national championship games." He also said, "It’s not in the rulebook. It was never addressed. So give [Pickett] kudos for being an innovative thinker that’s reading a fine line in the rules and finding a way to gain an advantage—legally and by rule—until they change it."

On December 10, 2021, the NCAA Rules Committee published an approved ruling to prohibit future use of a fake slide. The interpretation, informally named by some as the "Kenny Pickett rule," states that "[a]ny time a ball carrier begins, simulates, or fakes a feet-first slide, the ball shall be declared dead by the on field officials at that point." In response, Pickett tweeted, "Changed the game! #H2P". This rule was codified for 2022 during the NCAA Rules Committee meeting in March 2022.

Statistics

Source:

Team statistics
Individual statistics

References

External links
 Game statistics at statbroadcast.com

ACC Championship Game
Championship
Pittsburgh Panthers football games
Wake Forest Demon Deacons football games
ACC Championship Game
ACC Championship Game